Dinesh Kumar Pradhan is a Bhutanese politician who has been a member of the National Assembly of Bhutan, since October 2018.

Education 
He holds a Bachelor of Education degree from St. Francis Xavier University, Canada and a Master of Education degree from National Institute of Education, Samtse.

Political career 
He was elected to the National Assembly of Bhutan as a candidate of DPT from Ugyentse-Yoeseltse constituency in 2018 Bhutanese National Assembly election. He received 5,353 votes and defeated Lila Pradhan, a candidate of DPT.

References 

1960 births
Living people
Bhutanese people of Nepalese descent
Bhutanese MNAs 2018–2023
Druk Nyamrup Tshogpa politicians
St. Francis Xavier University alumni
Druk Nyamrup Tshogpa MNAs